Spermine oxidase is an enzyme that in humans is encoded by the SMOX gene.

Function 

The product of this gene is the polyamine oxidase. This enzyme potentially represents a new class of catabolic enzymes in the mammalian polyamine metabolic pathway capable of the efficient oxidation of polyamines. More than five transcript variants encoding four active isoenzymes have been identified for this gene, however, not all variants have been fully described. The characterized isoenzymes have distinctive biochemical characteristics and substrate specificities, suggesting the existence of additional levels of complexity in polyamine catabolism.

References

Further reading